The Phobos is a 2010 Russian horror film directed by Oleg Asadulin.

Plot

On a rainy summer day a group of young people go to a club called "Phobos", which is under construction and in the past used to be a bomb shelter. Suddenly all the club doors are automatically closed and the lights are switched off. Initially the characters perceive everything as a joke but later realize that they are trapped: their cell phones do not work and they did not tell anyone about their intention to go to this club. The goth girl Vika says that there is a creature that feeds on their fears and that they need to overcome their own feelings of fright.

Cast
 Pyotr Fyodorov as Mike
 Timofey Karataev as Alexander
Alex Sparrow as Zhenya
Tatyana Kosmacheva as Yulia
 Agniya Kuznetsova as Vika
 Renata Piotrovski as Ira
 Pyotr Tomashevskiy as Roman

References

External links
 

2010 films
Russian horror thriller films
2010 horror films
2010 horror thriller films
2010s English-language films
Films produced by Fyodor Bondarchuk